Elections to the Labour Party's Shadow Cabinet (more formally, its "Parliamentary Committee") occurred in November 1989. For these elections the Shadow Cabinet was expanded from 15 to 18 seats and, for the first time, MPs had to cast at least three votes for women.

In July 1989 Labour agreed to increase the number of places on the Shadow Cabinet and introduce positive discrimination to ensure more women were included. After considering several options for increasing the number of women in the Shadow Cabinet, the party voted for Llin Golding's proposal to require all MPs to cast at least three votes for women. As a result of these changes, the Shadow Cabinet elected in 1989 included four women for the first time.

In addition to the 18 members elected, the Leader (Neil Kinnock), Deputy Leader (Roy Hattersley), Labour Chief Whip (Derek Foster), Labour Leader in the House of Lords (Cledwyn Hughes), Chief Whip in the House of Lords (Thomas Ponsonby), House of Lords Shadow Cabinet representative (Joe Dean) and Chairman of the Parliamentary Labour Party (Stan Orme) were automatically members.

The 18 winners of the election are listed below:

† Multiple candidates tied for position.

References

1989
1989 elections in the United Kingdom